DWDD (1134 AM) AFP Radio is a radio station owned and operated by the Armed Forces of the Philippines through its Civil Relations Service. Its radio transmitter and studios are located at PVAO Building, Camp Aguinaldo, EDSA, Quezon City. This is the radio station usually being listened to during emergencies like natural disasters.

History

1986-1987: DZAF
DWDD was established on July 01, 1986, as DZAF under the Ministry Order Number a-092. It began broadcasting on September 1, 1986, with 10 kW power from the Top Floor of the former 6th Brigade Headquarters. Despite its success, in August 1987, DZAF ceased its operations due to the exploitation by certain sectors in the military.

1988-present: DWDD
The station revived on January 4, 1988, under the call sign DWDD "Ang Kabalikat Radyo" with a meager 1 kW power. On August 1, 1991, it was placed under the operational control of the Office of the Deputy Chief of Staff for Civil Military Operations, J7, Armed Forces of the Philippines. On July 1, 1994, Civil Relations Service, AFP took over the administrative and operational control of the station, months after DZCA closed shop.

Following the donation of 5 units 10 kW AM Radio transmitters from the Taiwan Ministry of National Defense in April 1993, DWDD was able to operate with a 10-kW power upon the successful installation of one of the main transmitting equipment.

Around October 2009, it ceased its operations again to upgrade its transmission facilities. In January 2010, it was launched once again. 

In 2018, DWDD started carrying the Ka-Tropa Radio branding and later in 2020 was rebranded AFP Radio.

DWDD AFP RADIO "Ang Boses ng Kawal Pilipino" supports national goals and helps accomplish DND and AFP missions by serving as an effective medium of information for its military and civilian personnel and the general public, not just thru radio, but also on social media, with livestreams on its official FB page.

References

External links
Department of National Defense
DWDD Listen Live

DWDD-AM
Radio stations in Metro Manila
News and talk radio stations in the Philippines
Radio stations established in 1986
Radio stations established in 1988
1986 establishments in the Philippines